Kuklev (from кукла meaning doll) is a Russian masculine surname, its feminine counterpart is Kukleva. It may refer to
Galina Kukleva (born 1972), Russian biathlete
Mikhail Kuklev (born 1982), Russian ice hockey defenceman
Valentin Kuklev (born 1948), Russian author

Russian-language surnames